Roberto Piva (September 25, 1937, São Paulo – July 3, 2010, São Paulo) was a Brazilian poet and writer.  He died from complications from Parkinson's disease.

Bibliography

Booklet
 Ode a Fernando Pessoa, 1961

Individual works
 Paranóia, 1963
 Piazzas, 1964
 Abra os olhos e diga ah!, 1975
 Coxas, 1979
 20 Poemas com Brócoli, 1981
 Antologia Poética, 1985
 Ciclones, 1997
 Um Estrangeiro na Legião: obras reunidas, volume 1, 2005
 Mala na Mão & Asas Pretas: obras reunidas, volume 2, 2006
 Estranhos Sinais de Saturno: obras reunidas, volume 3, 2008

References
Obituary (in Portuguese)

1937 births
2010 deaths
Brazilian male poets
People from São Paulo
Neurological disease deaths in São Paulo (state)
Deaths from Parkinson's disease
20th-century Brazilian poets
20th-century Brazilian male writers